Bouvines was the lead ship for her class of two ironclad coast-defence ships built for the French Navy in the early 1890s. Completed in 1895, she always served as a flagship and was initially assigned to the Northern Squadron. The ship was briefly reduced to reserve in 1898, but was reactivated later that year as part of the Mediterranean Squadron. Three years later, Bouvines rejoined the Northern Squadron.

The ship was again placed in reserve in 1907, but was recommissioned in 1910 as flagship for the units assigned to the English Channel. Later that year she badly damaged a French destroyer in a collision at night while training. Bouvines returned to reserve status in 1912, but she was decommissioned the following year. Despite this, the ship served as a guard ship during World War I. Bouvines was condemned in mid-1918 and was sold for scrap in 1920.

Design and description
The Bouvines-class coast-defence ships were ordered in accordance with the 's belief in the primacy of coastal defences and commerce raiding. They  displaced . Once in service they proved to roll badly so bilge keels were later fitted. The crew of the Bouvines class numbered 15 officers and 318 ratings; service as a flagship added 5 more officers and 33 more ratings.

The Bouvines-class ships were powered by two inclined horizontal triple-expansion steam engines, each driving a  propeller. Bouviness engines used steam provided by 16 d'Allest-Lagrafel water-tube boilers at a working pressure of  that exhausted through two funnels.

Armament and armor
The Bouvines-class ships carried their main battery of two Canon de  Modèle 1887 guns in two single-gun turrets, one each fore and aft of the superstructure. Their secondary armament consisted of eight Canon de  Modèle 1892 guns, four of which were mounted in individual casemates. The other four were carried on pivot mounts with gun shields on the shelter deck directly above the four casemated guns on the corners of the superstructure.

Initially four Canon de  Modèle 1885 Hotchkiss guns were carried for defence from torpedo boats in the fighting top in the military mast, but this was later increased to eight, with the new guns on the superstructure. Initially ten  Hotchkiss revolving cannon were positioned on the superstructure, but this was reduced to three when the additional 47 mm guns were added. Two  torpedo tubes were mounted above the waterline, but they were removed in 1906.

They were intended to have  of the belt showing above the waterline, but they were overweight as completed and only  of the belt was above the waterline. The plates protecting the conning tower measured  in thickness.

Construction and career

Bouvines, named for the 1214 Battle of Bouvines, was authorized in the 1889 Supplementary Naval Programme and was ordered from Forges et Chantiers de la Méditerranée on 18 December 1889. The ship was laid down on 30 September 1890 at their La Seyne-sur-Mer shipyard and launched on 29 March 1892. She was commissioned for preliminary trials on 15 October 1894, but excessive heating in her boiler rooms and funnels took some time to rectify and official trials did not begin until mid-1895. A premature detonation of a 47 mm shell during gunnery tests on 23 July killed two men and wounded two others, including Rear Admiral Chateauminois, President of the Trials Commission. Bouvines was fully commissioned on 1 December. Her construction cost 14,986,587 francs.

The ship arrived at Brest on 22 January 1896 and briefly became the flagship of Rear Admiral Ménard, commander of the Second Battleship Division of the Northern Squadron, on 1 February. Ménard was replaced eight days later by Rear Admiral Charles-Félix-Edgard de Courthille. Bouvines had engine problems shortly afterwards and conducted trials on the 22nd. For the next year and a half, she spent her time at sea training in the English Channel and Bay of Biscay, interrupted only by ferrying the President of France, Félix Faure, from Saint-Nazaire to Rochefort on 22 April 1897. De Courthille was relieved by Rear Admiral Auguste Éléonor de Penfentenyo de Kervéréguen on 10 October 1898 and transferred his flag to another ship when Bouvines was ordered to proceed to Toulon to be placed in reserve on 26 September.

The ship was recommissioned on 15 December and became the flagship of Rear Admiral Léonce Caillard, commander of the Coast-Defence Division of the Mediterranean Squadron. She conducted routine exercises off the coast of Provence in 1899 and Caillard was replaced by Rear Admiral Escande on 15 July, but he was relieved in his turn by Rear Admiral Charles-Alfred Mallarmé on 1 September. Bouvines departed Toulon on 21 June 1900 together with the rest of the Mediterranean Squadron to participate in manoeuvres with the Northern Squadron in the Channel and the Bay of Biscay. From 22 July the division was attached to the Northern Squadron and based in Cherbourg with reduced crews.

The crews were filled out to full strength in preparation for the following year's manoeuvres and gunnery exercises in the Mediterranean. The Northern Squadron departed Cherbourg on 20 June 1901 and returned on 13 August. Bouvines rejoined the 2nd Battleship Division on 1 September as the flagship of Rear Admiral Rouvier. The division was transferred to Brest in 1902 and then joined the rest of the Squadron for the annual manoeuvres in the Mediterranean on 30 June. The ship made port visits in Lisbon, Portugal, and French North Africa between exercises before returning to Cherbourg on 4 September. Over the next three years, she trained in the Channel and the Bay of Biscay. Rouvier was relieved by Rear Admiral François Leygue on 28 March 1904; Rear Admiral Joseph-Albert Philibert replaced him on 3 April 1906. The Northern Squadron joined with the Mediterranean Squadron for combined manoeuvres in the Eastern Mediterranean in mid-1906 and returned to Brest after the customary port visits on 28 August. The division arrived at Cherbourg on 5 October and Bouvines was reduced to reserve there on 1 January 1907.

The ship was reactivated on 13 April 1910 as the flagship for the commander of the Channel Flotillas. She was sent to Calais to assist with the salvage of the wreck of the submarine  on 28 May. While conducting night training on 13 September, Bouvines collided with, and badly damaged, the destroyer . She was returned to reserve at Cherbourg on 1 June 1912 and was decommissioned on 1 July 1913. Bouvines was reactivated on 1 August 1914, just a few days before the French declaration of war on Imperial Germany. She served as the guard ship for Cherbourg until 1917. The ship was condemned and stricken from the navy list on 8 June 1918. Her hulk was sold for FF550,000 on 19 June 1920.

Notes

Citations

References

External links

 nice picture gallery of the ships once you scroll about 2/3 down

1892 ships
Bouvines-class ironclads
Ships built in France